The Roosevelt Warehouse, more commonly known as the Detroit Public Schools Book Depository, is a building on 14th & Marantette Street in Detroit, Michigan. It is understood to have been designed by Albert Kahn and that it was originally a Post Office before being used as the Public Schools' surplus equipment depository. It is currently owned by Ford Motor Company who renovated it, as part of its new Michigan Central Mobility Innovation District into a innovation center. Major tenants signed to move into the building include New Lab, a multi-disciplinary technology company.

History
The building caught fire in 1987. The fire and efforts to extinguish it heavily damaged much of the supplies inside, which included science and sports equipment, scissors, crayons, and books, many still unused and in their original wrapping. After the fire the building was abandoned, along with all of its contents. The reason why the building's contents were not salvaged by Detroit Public Schools is unknown.

Over the years of abandonment, the building and its contents were heavily vandalized and further damaged by scrappers.

In 2009 a frozen human corpse was found in the basement in a lift-shaft. It took 24 hours before the authorities attended to the scene. Previously easy to enter, the building was then boarded up. The contents of the warehouse were removed over the summer of 2012 in preparation for possible conversion into a parking garage.  

In 2018, both the warehouse and the Michigan Central Station were purchased by the Ford Motor Company.

In 2021, it was announced that New Lab would be the first major tenent in the building.

References

External links
 
 The book depository at Detroiturbex.com
 A video tour of the warehouse soon after the body was found in the elevator shaft

Corktown, Detroit
Ford Motor Company facilities
Mill architecture